David Lush (December 31, 1887 – November 8, 1960) was a provincial politician from Alberta, Canada. He served as a member of the Legislative Assembly of Alberta from 1935 to 1940 sitting with the Social Credit caucus in government.

Political career
Lush ran for a seat to the Alberta Legislature as a Social Credit candidate in the electoral district of Empress for the 1935 Alberta general election. He defeated incumbent William Smith and other candidate with a landslide majority to pick up the seat for his party.

Empress merged with Bow Valley in the 1939 boundary redistribution to form Bow Valley-Empress. Lush retired from provincial politics at dissolution of the assembly in 1940.

References

External links
 Legislative Assembly of Alberta Members Listing

Alberta Social Credit Party MLAs
1960 deaths
1887 births
People from Guelph